Richard Barry Bernstein  (October 31, 1923 – July 8, 1990) was an American physical chemist. He is primarily known for his research in chemical kinetics and reaction dynamics by molecular beam scattering and laser techniques. He is credited with having founded femtochemistry, which laid the groundwork for developments in femtobiology. He was elected a Fellow of the American Academy of Arts and Sciences in 1970. Among his awards were the National Medal of Science and the Willard Gibbs Award, both in 1989.

Bernstein received his doctorate in chemistry from Columbia University in 1948.

Bernstein suffered a heart attack in Moscow and died shortly afterwards in Helsinki, Finland, aged 66.

References

Online Archive of California - ''University of California: In Memoriam, Richard B. Bernstein

External links
National Medal of Science

National Academy of Sciences Biographical Memoir

1923 births
1990 deaths
Fellows of the American Academy of Arts and Sciences
National Medal of Science laureates
American physical chemists
Columbia Graduate School of Arts and Sciences alumni
University of Michigan faculty
Fellows of the American Physical Society